The Lovell Chronicle is a regional weekly newspaper published in Lovell, Wyoming. It covers news and sports for the cities of Lovell, Byron, Cowley, Deaver and Frannie.  The first edition was printed on May 31, 1906.  The Chronicle has maintained the same name since it was founded.

External links
Lovell Chronicle Home Page

Newspapers published in Wyoming
Publications established in 1906
1906 establishments in Wyoming